is a fictional character and the protagonist of the Kid Icarus series. Debuting in Kid Icarus for the Nintendo Entertainment System in 1986, Pit would later appear in Kid Icarus: Of Myths and Monsters for the Game Boy in 1991, and Kid Icarus: Uprising for the Nintendo 3DS in 2012.

Pit has also made various appearances in many other Nintendo games, most notably as a playable character in the Super Smash Bros. series. He was also one of the recurring characters in the Captain N: The Game Master animated series, but named Kid Icarus. Since his introduction, Pit has been generally well received by video game critics.

Characteristics 
Pit's character takes elements from three of Nintendo's biggest franchises; he can jump like Mario, use ability-enhancing objects like Link, and shoot enemies like Samus Aran. IGN's Lucas M. Thomas, in a feature about Pit, commented that Pit's inspiration in Greek mythology was more prominent than Sony's God of War series, and that Pit could be viewed as a combination between Eros and Icarus. Thomas noted Pit's speech, saying it could become a distinguishing difference between him and other Nintendo characters such as Link. Thomas said that both his bow and his wings were his most iconic characteristics.

The Kid Icarus series contains several references to Icarus, Eros, and Eros' Roman equivalent Cupid, including currency depicted as "hearts"; heart-motifs used in Pit's early character art; and his Japanese name, "Pitto" (ピット) might be a reference to the Japanese katakana for Cupid (キューピッド "Kyūpiddo"). In addition to Eros and Icarus, Pit shares several characteristics with Perseus, the hero sent by Athena (who Palutena is thought to be based on) to slay Medusa.

Pit's design was vastly updated for his inclusion in Super Smash Bros. Brawl, and has become his standard design since then. According to Masahiro Sakurai, the creator of the Super Smash Bros. series and director of Kid Icarus: Uprising, he initially alternated between using Pit's 2D design, his cartoonish art design, and a 3D redesign for Pit's inclusion before ultimately settling on the latter. Sakurai stated that Pit's redesign was based on the concept of how his appearance would have slowly modernized had the Kid Icarus series remained active, much like how Link's design has done throughout the various subsequent installments within The Legend of Zelda series. In comparison to his previous design, Pit now appears approximately 13 years old in angel years. and stands approximately 180 cm (5'11'") tall.

Pit's signature weapons are a bow and arrow. Initially unnamed in Kid Icarus, the bow received an overhauled design, a name and an origin to coincide with Pit's inclusion as a playable character in Super Smash Bros. Brawl. The bow and was stated as having been discovered by Pit in the Underworld and being capable of firing arrows of light.

However, as the Super Smash Bros. games sometimes differ slightly from the canon of the series that it represents, the bow's name and origin were changed in Kid Icarus: Uprising. In Uprising, it retains its updated design from Brawl, but is now known as the Palutena Bow and is revealed to have been crafted by its namesake, the Goddess of Light Palutena. Aside from the Palutena Bow, Pit can use various other bows, as well as new types of weapons that provide vastly different effects.

Appearances 

In Kid Icarus: Of Myths and Monsters, Pit is once again summoned by Palutena to protect the Overworld, this time from the demon Orcus. Pit once again searches for the Three Sacred Treasures, which are being protected by the forest guardians, in order to defeat Orcus.

In Kid Icarus: Uprising, Pit faces off against a newly resurrected Medusa 25 years after her first defeat while heeding advice from Palutena along the way. Due to the vast difference in gameplay in comparison to previous installments, director Masahiro Sakurai claimed that Pit would feel like a brand new character for his appearance in Uprising, thanks to the implementation of various new weapons and abilities. Another notable divergence Uprising has from its predecessors, and even most Nintendo titles in general, is that Pit, Palutena and other major characters have actual dialogue instead of textboxes displaying their dialogue.

Other appearances 
Pit made a cameo in Tetris for the NES; he plays a violin when the player completes the game in a certain way. Pit appeared in F-1 Race before Course 8, where he appears to cheer the player on. He also appears during the ending sequence. In WarioWare: Twisted!, the player directs Pit left or right to dodge snakes and eggplants thrown at the player from above. In WarioWare: Smooth Moves for the Wii, Pit appears in the conducting game where he is playing a cello. In Super Smash Bros. Melee, a trophy of Pit can be earned in the game, while a portion of his trophy's description is "Will Pit ever fight again?", which ultimately foreshadowed his eventual inclusion in Melees sequel.

In Super Smash Bros. Brawl for the Wii, Pit appears as a playable character. Pit's main weapon in the game is a bow called the Sacred Bow of Palutena, or simply Pit's Bow. The bow can also split into two short swords that Pit holds in each hand. In "The Subspace Emissary", Pit witnesses the Subspace Army invade the World of Trophies and is granted permission by Palutena to attack the army. After reviving Mario, he teams up with him and they chase after the Ancient Minister. Depending on whether the player makes Kirby rescue Princess Peach or Princess Zelda at the beginning of the game, Mario and Pit will either attack or be attacked by Link and Yoshi when a hostile clone of the princess the defenders destroyed is mistaken for the actual princess. Pit and Mario (or Link and Yoshi) are later kidnapped by King Dedede (who was mistaken as a Subspace Army member), but are rescued by Kirby soon after. Later, Pit and the other Brawl fighters face Tabuu at the end of the Great Maze in order to stop Tabuu's conquest of the World of Trophies.

Pit appears as one of the playable characters in Super Smash Bros. for Nintendo 3DS and Wii U. Compared to his appearance in Brawl, Pit's moveset was also shown to have been updated in reference to Kid Icarus: Uprising. Pit also appears again as a playable fighter in the series' fifth installment, Super Smash Bros. Ultimate.

Appearances in other media 
In Captain N: The Game Master, Pit is known as Kid Icarus and is voiced by Alessandro Juliani. He is one of the main characters and a member of the N-Team, having the habit of adding "-icus" to the end of some of his words. He also appears in the Captain N Valiant Comics. Pit also appears in three animated 3D shorts created by Production I.G, Studio 4°C and Shaft, which were collaborations with Nintendo to promote Kid Icarus: Uprising via Nintendo Video.

Pit, along with his doppelgänger Dark Pit, have their own Amiibo figures as part of the Super Smash Bros. series.

Reception 
Pit was chosen as one of the 11 more powerful archers in popular culture by UGO Networks' TJ Dietsch. Jesse Schedeen, from IGN, said the character was one of those he most wanted to see on the Wii and Phil Pirrello, Bozon and Richard George said that the character was one of their favorite brawlers in Super Smash Bros. Brawl. Jesse Schedeen selected the character as one of those most likely to get a shot on the Wii and regretted the character not appearing at the Game Developers Conference. GameDaily said that Pit was the 19th top Nintendo character of all time, and ranked him seventh in their "Top 10 Super Smash Bros. Characters". In 2012, GamesRadar ranked him as the 69th best hero in video games.

Game Informers Dan Ryckert included Pit, as he appeared in Super Smash Bros. Brawl, on a comedic list entitled "Characters Who Don't Deserve Their Own Games". Rickert opined that Pit had been an obscure choice for Nintendo, and stated that he hoped Nintendo did not hope to follow up his appearance with a new Kid Icarus title. Jeremy Parish of Polygon ranked 73 fighters from Super Smash Bros. Ultimate "from garbage to glorious", placing Pit at 43rd, and stated that " this kid is named after his number-one leading cause of death. There's something weird and grim about that, and we're not entirely on board with it". Gavin Jasper of Den of Geek ranked the Pit 30th on his list of Super Smash Bros. Ultimate characters, stating that "his inclusion in Smash paid off and he got a long-awaited new adventure. Not only did he return for more Smash'm installments, but so did two other characters from Kid Icarus: Uprising''. Way to go, nostalgia!".

References

External links 

 Pit on the Smash Bros. DOJO!!.

Fictional angels
Fictional archers
Fictional bodyguards in video games
Fictional child soldiers
Fictional Greek people
Fictional humanoids
Fictional soldiers in video games
Fictional swordfighters in video games
Kid Icarus characters
Male characters in video games
Nintendo protagonists
Super Smash Bros. fighters
Teenage characters in video games
Video game characters introduced in 1986
Video game characters who use magic